1963 may refer to:

The year 1963
"1963" (song), a song by New Order
"1963", a song on the album Happenstance by Rachael Yamagata
1963 (comics), a 1993 comic book limited series